WHKS is an FM radio station licensed to Port Allegany, Pennsylvania. The station, branded as "K94", broadcasts on 94.9 MHz with an adult contemporary format.

External links

HKS
Radio stations established in 1990